The Coney Island Mermaid Parade is an art parade held annually in Coney Island, Brooklyn, New York. The event, the largest art parade in the United States, is held each year in June and celebrates the arrival of the summer season. Created and produced by the non-profit arts organization Coney Island USA, the 40th annual parade was held on June 18, 2022.

Description 

The Mermaid Parade traditionally takes place on the Saturday closest to the summer solstice, June 21, regardless of weather. Its intent is to celebrate self-expression, boost pride in Coney Island, and give New York artists a place to display their artwork.  There are no ethnic, religious, or commercial aims.

The parade pays homage to the Coney Island Mardi Gras parades of the early 20th century. During this era, Coney Island was the primary amusement park destination for those in the New York metropolitan area. Like the annual Village Halloween Parade, the Mermaid Parade evokes the artistic spirit of Mardi Gras.

The event typically attracts about 3,000 participants and hundreds of thousands of spectators from all five boroughs of New York City. After the last participant passes the reviewing stand, parade founder Dick Zigun leads the procession to the beach for a ceremony representing the opening of the ocean for the summer swimming season.

History 

The tradition began in 1983, when the first event of this kind was conceptualized and organized by Dick Zigun, the founder of the non-profit arts organization Coney Island USA, who is sometimes dubbed the "Mayor of Coney Island.

The parade of June 22, 2013 was almost canceled due to a lack of money and resources following the recovery from Hurricane Sandy. It was rescued through a successful Kickstarter campaign that raised $117,000, more than the $100,000 goal.

The 2020 parade was replaced by a virtual event (The Tail-a-Thon) due to the COVID-19 pandemic. The parade was delayed in 2021 to September 12 (marking the last weekend that lifeguards would be on duty at Coney Island) in order to improve the chances that it could be held, but on August 18 it was announced that the parade would be cancelled out of an abundance of caution due to a resurgence of COVID-19 in the region.

Themes 

The Mermaid Parade is known for marine costumes and occasional nudity. There are sections in the parade for vehicles of all kinds, for floats, for groups, and for individuals. The organizers of the parade claim to encourage bribery, so that participants have a better chance to win the various costume contests, which are also part of the day's entertainment.

Each year the Mermaid Parade features a King Neptune and Queen Mermaid.

Gallery

See also
Julián Is a Mermaid

References

External links 

 
 
 
 Coney Island Mermaids - Photos
 Photo essay on 2010 Mermaid Parade
 

Articles containing video clips
Coney Island Mermaid Parade
Mermaid Parade
Recurring events established in 1983
Summer events in the United States